Adam Edward King (born 14 September 1999) is an English former first-class cricketer.

King was born at Aylesbury in September 1999. He was educated at Stowe School, before going up to Loughborough University. While studying at Loughborough, he played two first-class cricket matches for Loughborough MCCU against Leicestershire and Kent in 2019. Playing as a wicket-keeper, he scored 53 runs in his two matches with a high score of 33. King is also a member of the Northamptonshire academy and has represented the county at second eleven level.

References

External links

1999 births
Living people
People from Aylesbury
People educated at Stowe School
Alumni of Loughborough University
English cricketers
Loughborough MCCU cricketers